Lipsitz is a surname. Notable people with the surname include:

George Lipsitz (born 1947), American Studies scholar
Kevin Lipsitz, American competitive eater
Robert Lipsitz (1942–2020), American bridge player